Seiad Valley is a small unincorporated community in Siskiyou County, California situated 15 miles south of the Oregon border. A population of approximately 300 people is clustered around the Klamath River, State Route 96, and spread out along the surrounding creeks. The three craggy peaks of the Lower Devils look over the forested valley, which is completely surrounded on all sides by the green Klamath Mountains, just north of the Marble Mountains Wilderness area. The Pacific Crest Trail, which runs all the way from Canada to Mexico, passes through the West Side of Seiad Valley. A general store/cafe/post office, an elementary school, a small trailer park, a volunteer fire house, forest service station, gas station and the historic Wildwood Tavern and Lodge make up central portion of the town; beyond that are small agricultural/herding fields, a scattering of residences, and the bridges crossing the Klamath River.  Seiad Valley is within zip code 96086, but itself is not incorporated and so has no strictly defined boundaries.

Population
Approximately 350 people live in Seiad Valley. The vast majority are of European descent, a small minority is Hispanic, and another minority has some portion of Karuk or other native American ancestry.

Most people live in houses scattered about the mountains, usually along paved side-roads or dirt former logging roads. A small number of people live far off in the hills, some living a more subsistence lifestyle.

The population does not include many young people, and is increasingly aging as the younger generation moves away to find broader opportunities, although the internet is changing that dynamic.

Economy and politics
The local economy includes river miners, forest service workers, farmers, health service workers, utilities managers, construction workers, Caltrans workers, pack mule trainers, elementary/high school teachers, social workers, secretaries, cooks, and self-employed business workers. Part of the population is either unemployed or living, in part, off of Social Security benefits.

A large number work in nearby Happy Camp or farther away in the county seat of Yreka. Increasingly, people are living in the pastoral setting of Seiad Valley while remote working for employers in San Francisco, Sacramento, or the Los Angeles area. The internet has made such long distance business possible and is changing the demographics of the area. The older inhabitants of the town are generally more conservative and more closely identified with the small town atmosphere while the newer inhabitants are generally more liberal and raised in urban areas.

Seiad Valley is within the mythical "State of Jefferson", an area encompassing several northern California counties. (Some southern Oregon counties are also occasionally included in the "State of Jefferson", as well.) The yellow and black "double-cross" flag of the State of Jefferson flies over the general store, although the American flag flies over the nearby elementary school. Pro-Jefferson sentiment is significant, but not particularly active in the area.

Culture
Seiad Valley's two claims to fame are the Pacific Crest Trail and the Seiad Cafe. The first is a beautiful hiking trail that winds through the Klamath mountains, passing through Seiad Valley along the way. During the spring and summer months hikers are a frequent sight in the central area of Seiad Valley as they pass through town to buy supplies.

Secondly, the Seiad Cafe was nominated third in the Travel Channel's "Top 10 Places to Pig Out" for all of America. The flap-jack challenge at the Cafe gives the eater a free meal, but only if he or she is able to finish five inch-thick, dinner-plate sized pancakes in less than two hours.

Seiad Day is the yearly local celebration, and features a parade, games, music and late-night parties for the locals.

Politics
In the state legislature Seiad Valley is in the 4th Senate District, represented by Republican Doug LaMalfa, and in the 2nd Assembly District, represented by Republican Jim Nielsen.

References

Unincorporated communities in California
Unincorporated communities in Siskiyou County, California